The Estadio de la Unidad Deportiva Hermanos López Rayón is a multi-use stadium in Uruapan, Michoacán.  It is currently used mostly for football matches and is the home stadium for C.D. Uruapan  The stadium has a capacity of 6,000 people.

References

Football venues in Mexico
Athletics (track and field) venues in Mexico
Sports venues in Michoacán